Eothenomys is a genus of rodent in the family Cricetidae. It contains the following species:
 Kachin red-backed vole (Eothenomys cachinus)
 Pratt's vole (Eothenomys chinensis)
 Southwest China vole (Eothenomys custos)
 Père David's vole (Eothenomys melanogaster)
 Yunnan red-backed vole (Eothenomys miletus)
 Chaotung vole (Eothenomys olitor)
 Yulungshan vole (Eothenomys proditor)
 Ward's red-backed vole (Eothenomys wardi)

References

 
Rodent genera
Taxa named by Gerrit Smith Miller Jr.
Taxonomy articles created by Polbot